Longiantrum coclea is a moth of the family Erebidae first described by Michael Fibiger in 2010. It is known from northern Vietnam.

The wingspan is about 11 mm. The head, patagia, anterior part of the tegulae, prothorax, basal part of the costa, costal part of the medial area and the terminal area, including the fringes are black. The costal medial area is quadrangular. The forewing ground colour is beige throughout, suffused with few black scales. All crosslines are indistinct and black, except the terminal line, which is marked by black interneural dots. The hindwing is grey and the terminal line is light brown. The underside of the forewing is light brown, while the underside of the hindwing is grey.

References

Micronoctuini
Moths described in 2010
Taxa named by Michael Fibiger